Denton is a hamlet in the civil parish of Cuddesdon and Denton in Oxfordshire, England.  Denton's toponym is derived from the Old English den-tun meaning "valley farmstead".  Denton is in a fold of the landscape, between the two hills on which Cuddesdon and Garsington stand. Denton is an ancient manor and had its own civil parish, but it was merged with neighbouring Cuddesdon in the 20th century.

See also
 Chippinghurst Manor

References

South Oxfordshire District
Hamlets in Oxfordshire